Alfred L. Edwards (August 9, 1920 – January 26, 2007) was an American economist who was emeritus professor of business administration at Ross School of Business at the University of Michigan, and the first African-American Deputy Assistant Secretary of Agriculture in the United States.

Early life and education 

Edwards was the only son of Eddie and Kathleen Edwards. He was a veteran of the Second World War, and graduated from Livingstone College with a BA in 1948, The University of Michigan in 1949, and the University of Iowa in 1958 with a PhD.

Career 
Edwards taught at Southern University, the University of Iowa, Michigan State University, and Howard University before being appointed as Deputy Assistant Secretary of Agriculture in 1963. He served in this role from 1963 to 1973, receiving the Distinguished Service Award of the Department of Agriculture in 1969. He joined the Ross School of Business at the University of Michigan in 1974, and remained at that institution for the remainder of his career. He served as president of the National Economic Association, and was a longtime trustee of Western Michigan University.

Selected works 

 Cole, John A., Alfred L. Edwards, Earl G. Hamilton, and Lucy J. Reuben. "Black banks: a survey and analysis of the literature." The Review of Black Political Economy 14, no. 1 (1985): 29-50.
 Edwards, Alfred L. "Land Reform in Iraq: Economic and Social Implications." Land Economics 37, no. 1 (1961): 68-81.

Legacy 

There are several memorials to Edwards at Ross School of Business. The Annual Black Business Students Association Conference at the Ross School of Business is named in his honor, there is an Alfred L. Edwards Collegiate Professorship named for him, and an Alfred L. Edwards Scholarship. The National Economic Association also established the Alfred Edwards Award for service to that organization.

References 

1920 births
2007 deaths
Livingstone College alumni
Ross School of Business faculty
African-American economists
United States Department of Agriculture officials
University of Michigan alumni
University of Iowa alumni
20th-century African-American people
21st-century African-American people
Presidents of the National Economic Association